Una Navidad en Verano is a 2017 Peruvian Christmas musical comedy film directed by Ricardo Morán (in his directorial debut) and written by Gonzalo Rodríguez Risco. Starring Maricarmen Marin and Marco Zunino.

Synopsis 
It tells the story of Daniela, a charismatic and fighting woman in charge of four children. A few days before Christmas, an unexpected event will make everyone understand that the most important thing is to be together.

Cast 
The actors participating in this film are:

 Maricarmen Marín as Daniela
 Marco Zunino as Alberto
 Armando Machuca as Armando
 Ray del Castillo
 Kareem Pizarro
 Aitana Osorio
 Raúl Huamán

Production 
Principal photography for the film began on June 5, 2017 and ended on July 9 of the same year.

Release 
Una Navidad en Verano premiered on November 30, 2017, in Peruvian theaters with a version with subtitles and sign language for people with hearing limitations.

References

External links 

 

2017 films
2017 musical films
2017 comedy films
Peruvian musical comedy films
2010s Christmas comedy films
2010s Spanish-language films
2010s Peruvian films
Films set in Peru
Films shot in Peru
Films about dogs
Films about children
2017 directorial debut films